Hum Dono (English: Both of us) is a 1995 Indian action thriller film starring Rishi Kapoor, Nana Patekar and Pooja Bhatt. It was inspired by the film Planes, Trains and Automobiles, starring Steve Martin and John Candy. But the story really looks to be loosely based on Rain Man, starring Dustin Hoffman and Tom Cruise. The movie was the only directorial movie for Late actor Shafi Inamdar.

Cast 
 Rishi Kapoor... Rajesh "Raju"
 Nana Patekar... Vishal Saigal 
 Pooja Bhatt... Priyanka Gupta
 Mohnish Bahl... Sameer Choudhury (as Mohanish Behl)
 Mohan Joshi... Shreechand
 Alok Nath... Vikram Saigal
Pushkar Jog... Child artist

Soundtrack

External links

1995 films
1990s Hindi-language films
Films scored by Anand–Milind